Harry Alfred Rée, DSO, OBE (15 October 1914 – 17 May 1991) was a British educationist and wartime member of the Special Operations Executive. Of the more than 400 SOE agents who worked in France during World War II, M.R.D. Foot, the official historian of the SOE, named Rée as one of the half-dozen best male agents.

Harry Rée was born in England, the son of Dr. Alfred Rée, a chemist who was from a Danish Jewish family, and Lavinia Elisabeth Dimmick, the American-born great granddaughter of chemist and industrialist Eleuthère Irénée du Pont. He was educated at Shrewsbury School, St John's College, Cambridge, and the Institute of Education, University of London. In 1937 he became a language master at Bradford Grammar School, and later at Beckenham and Penge County School for Boys. In 1940 he married Hetty, daughter of Eardley Vine, of Beaconsfield. They had three children, Janet, Brian and the philosopher Jonathan.

In the Second World War Rée was registered in 1940 as a conscientious objector conditional upon working in the National Fire Service, but in 1941 re-registered for military service and was called up into the army. He later volunteered for the Special Operations Executive, receiving a captaincy in the Intelligence Corps and the codename "César". In April 1943 he was parachuted into France and joined the Acrobat Network around Montbéliard. Later he became active in the Stockbroker Network around Belfort.

Rée spoke against RAF bombing in France, arguing that it was turning French public opinion against the Allies. He suggested that SOE agents could organise effective sabotage of factories on the ground. He organised the destruction of the Peugeot factory at Sochaux by convincing the local director, who was already resisting, to co-operate with SOE. The local director's sabotage was more efficient, and he managed to share tactical information on the Wehrmacht projects they had had to become involved in (especially the V-1). On 5 November 1943 Rée organised a decoy attack on compressors and transformers at Sochaux to transfer the blame. Therefore, the RAF did not bomb the factory.

The Germans tried to capture Rée, who escaped a Feldgendarmerie group after being shot four times and, according to his own account, had to swim across a river and crawl through a forest. He managed to reach Switzerland and still keep some contact with his organisation. In May 1944 he was replaced by an American officer, E.F. Floege, and returned to Britain. He starred in the film Now it Can be Told (aka School for Danger), produced by the RAF Film Unit, which told the story of SOE's activities in France.

The Imperial War Museum has an on-line recording of Rée praising the role of the passive supporters who also risked their lives. 

In 1951, Rée became headmaster of Watford Grammar School for Boys. He appeared occasionally on the BBC Television "Brains Trust" programme. In 1962 he became the first professor of education at the University of York.

Rée wrote a biography of the educator and creator of Village Colleges, Henry Morris titled Educator Extraordinary: The Life and Achievements of Henry Morris (Longman, 1973), and produced a compilation of Morris' talks and articles titled The Henry Morris Collection (Cambridge University Press, 1984). He also wrote The Three Peaks of Yorkshire a walking guide. He died in 1991.

Bibliography

References

Further reading
The Secret History of SOE, pages 582–583 & 600, William MacKenzie

They Came from the Sky, pages 1-69, E.H. Cookridge

External links
 Index of personal papers and recordings at the Institute of Education .

1914 births
1991 deaths
Academics of the University of York
Alumni of St John's College, Cambridge
Du Pont family
Schoolteachers from Hertfordshire
English conscientious objectors
Heads of schools in England
British Special Operations Executive personnel
British Army personnel of World War II
Alumni of the UCL Institute of Education
People educated at Shrewsbury School
Intelligence Corps officers
Companions of the Distinguished Service Order
Officers of the Order of the British Empire
English people of Danish descent
English people of Jewish descent
English people of French descent
English people of American descent